Šumadija is a geographical region in the central part of Serbia. The area used to be heavily covered with forests, hence the name (from šuma 'forest'). The city of Kragujevac is the administrative center of the Šumadija District in the Šumadija and Western Serbia statistical region.

The region is very fertile, and it is known for its extensive fruit production (apples, grapes, plums, etc.).

Name
Šumadija received its name from the dense and impassable forests which covered the region, particularly in the 16th and 17th centuries. These forests were preserved until the early 19th century; they are mentioned in literature and tradition. Bertrandon de la Broquière (1400–1459) passed through Serbia, on the road from Palanka to Belgrade he "passed through very large forests". During the reign of Prince Miloš (1817–1839), Serbia was covered with dense forests, through which "no one could walk through, let alone with horse". When Alphonse de Lamartine took a trip to Serbia (1833), he described the forests as "like he was in the middle of the North American forests". In the Jasenica villages a tradition was maintained "that everywhere there were empty forests, and settlers called relatives to come and occupy the land how much they want ... the forests were in need of cutting down trees and burning for years ... it was so impassable, that one could walk for days through it, without seeing the sun".

The inhabitants of the region received the demonym, Šumadinci, which is used for the inhabitants between Morava in the east, Kolubara in the west, and the mountains of Crni Vrh, Kotlenik and Rudnik in the southeast, south and southwest. The inhabitants outside these border call this population Šumadinci.

Geography

Šumadija is located between mountain Kosmaj in the north, city Smederevska Palanka in the east, mountain Gledić in the south, and Kolubara, Ljig and Dičina in the west. According to some interpretations (for example, physiologist J. Cvijić and ethnologist J. Erdeljanović), the northern border of Šumadija lay between Avala and Kosmaj mountain. According to that view, the capital of Serbia, Belgrade does not belong to this region.

Central Šumadija is well known for its rich horticulture, with major products being plums, apples, pears, apricots, peaches, nuts, cherries, strawberries, and raspberries.

History

Prehistory
Archaeological sites of the Neolithic Starčevo culture and Vinča culture (5500–4500 BC) are widespread in Šumadija. Settlements of the late Starčevo phase are present in the entire territory of central Šumadija. Risovača Cave, in Aranđelovac is one of the most important archaeological sites of palaeolithic in Europe. Notable Neolithic sites include Grivac and Kusovac in the west, Divostin in the middle, and Dobrovodica and Rajac in the east.

Middle Ages
Šumadija was located directly northeast of Raška, the centre of the Serbian Principality. It is unclear where the exact border with the Bulgarian Khanate went in the 10th century. Prince Zaharija is known to have united several Slavic tribes along the common border to rebel against Bulgaria in the 920s. Časlav (r. 927–960), and Constantine Bodin (r. 1081–1101), may have held parts of Šumadija. The southern half of Šumadija later came under the rule of Grand Prince Stefan Nemanja and the Nemanjić dynasty (1166–1371).

Central Šumadija's three parts – Gruža, Jasenica and Lepenica, most likely existed as administrative divisions or župe (counties) during the Byzantine era. Of these, Gruža was mentioned in the beginning of the 11th century as a peripheral province. The province of Lepenica, with the status of župa, officially entered the realm of Grand Prince Stefan Nemanja in 1183, and later Nemanja granted it as property (metochion) to his endowment, the Hilandar monastery, which he confirmed in the 1198 chrysobull. The province of Dendra, which was held by Serbian ruler Desa (fl. 1150–66), has been interpreted as Šumadija by some scholars, and as Toplica but it has been concluded that it was in the vicinity of Niš; Leskovac (historically Glubočica and Dubočica).

The medieval Serbian state saw its end with the Serbian Despotate's fall in Šumadija in the 15th century.

Early modern history

Until the fall of the Serbian Despotate, the region was advanced, rich and well-populated. This stands out from the travellers that passed through Šumadija in that period. Many topographic names that have survived until today confirm old settlements, churches and monasteries (selište, crkvine, manastirine, kućerine, podrumine, varoševo, etc.), as does old graveyards and other traces. After the fall of the Despotate, opportunities changed. The Ottoman invasion and the events that took place in Šumadija up until the early 19th century were the primary cause for the population motion. Removing themselves ahead of the Ottomans, they left their homes, concealed themselves up in the mountains and ravines, or left in different directions. Settlements disappeared, the churches and monasteries were destroyed, and the population numbers constantly decreased. One traveller, Gerlach, described the path from Batočina to Palanka: "I couldn't find no trace of settlements or culture, everywhere there is wasteland, not a single piece of land has been cultivated, there is not a single village".

Pavle Bakić, who had estates on the Venčac, left between 1515 and 1522 "with a large group of people into Hungary". Schweiger, who passed through Serbia in 1577, among other things, said that he travelled from Kolar "[through] a deserted region, scarcely settled and badly processed, in three days not having seen more than five poor villages". In groups, or individually, families left their homeland and went in different directions, over (preko) the rivers, to Syrmia, Banat, Bačka and Slavonia, to Bosnia, and other regions. This flight lasted until the end of the 18th century, then again, after 1813. During the Austro-Turkish War (1787–91), in 1788, the population of the Šumadija villages Koraćice, Nemenikuća and Rogače fled preko. Among them were Milovan Vidaković, who described their way: "we are watching the villages through which and along which we passed, all are already covered in grass, not a living soul in them, all has gone; vineyards, gardens, flats, it's all empty and lying in weeds". More flights ensued after 1813. For example, the parents of activist Ilija Milosavljević-Kolarac fled preko with the rest of the peasants in 1813, to take shelter in front of the Ottoman army. In Orašac they crossed the Danube and settled in Crepaja, from where they later returned to their homes.

In addition to population emigration, there was also immigration, more or less, depending on the circumstance which prevailed in Šumadija. However, after the Austro-Turkish War, after the establishment of Koča's frontier, when Šumadija had a more bearable situation, it saw an increasing influx of settlers with its height after the outbreak of the First Serbian Uprising (1804). In the first decades of the 19th century Šumadija received most of its population. A liberated region, fruitful, and until then sparsely populated, it attracted settlers.

During the 18th century, the forests and hills of Šumadija were the refuge for the hajduk bands (brigands, rebels, guerilla fighters) that fought against Ottoman occupation. Parts of the Sanjak of Smederevo, all of Šumadija, were liberated by the Austrian army in 1718, resulting in the establishment of the Kingdom of Serbia (1718–39). After the Austro-Russian–Turkish War (1735–39), the sanjak was re-established. In 1788, the Habsburg-organized Serbian Free Corps liberated Šumadija, which, after subsequent Austrian military involvement, came together with the rest of the sanjak under Habsburg occupation (1788–92). The First Serbian Uprising, which broke out in 1804, saw the region liberated under self-organized Serbian rebels led by Šumadijan-born Karađorđe, the national hero of Serbia. The Second Serbian Uprising in 1815 was led by Miloš Obrenović who successfully repelled Ottoman forces and, by 1830, gained full autonomy for Serbia, leading to the independence of central Serbia after several centuries under Ottoman rule.

Contemporary period

Between 1922 and 1929, one of the administrative units in the Kingdom of Yugoslavia was the Šumadijska Oblast. It roughly included territory of present-day Šumadija District with its administrative seat in Kragujevac, which is the seat of the modern district as well.

Cities and towns

This section includes towns with a population larger than 15,000.

Kragujevac (150,835)
Aranđelovac (24,797)
Gornji Milanovac (24,216)
Mladenovac (23,609)
Smederevska Palanka (23,601)
Velika Plana (16,078)

Culture
The most common folk costume of Serbia is that of Šumadija. It includes the national hat, the Šajkača, and the traditional leather footwear, opanci. Older villagers still wear their traditional costumes.

The fertile region of Šumadija is particularly known for its plums and Slivovitz (Šljivovica), whose productions are of great importance to Šumadija Serbs and play a part in several of their local customs.

Anthropology

Studies by J. Cvijić

In the Šumadija regions – Kačer, Gruža, Lepenica, Kragujevačka Jasenica, Smederevsko Podunavlje and Jasenica, Kosmaj and in the villages around Belgrade, 8,894 kin families with 52,475 households were included in the study of J. Cvijić. Of these, only 464 families with 3,603 houses were "old" (starinci, also called "natives"), which is close to the number of families of unknown descent (470 families with 2,464 houses), with the rest of the population being settlers (7,960 families, 46,408 houses). Šumadija was settled from almost all of the regions of the then Kingdom of Yugoslavia, though most of which came from the Dinaric areas, that is, Montenegro, Bosnia and Herzegovina, from Raška and Sandžak, Dalmatia, Lika, and the rest of the Dinaric areas. In lesser numbers they hailed from Kosovo, from Metohija, and the rest of the Yugoslav regions.

According to the studies by J. Cvijić, almost 90% of the families of Šumadija descended from settler families of various Serb ethnographic groups. The Dinaric group was predominant, while other South Slavic regions are included in lesser percentages. This diverse population blended, mutually permeated and leveled, thus creating an ethnographic group (the Šumadinci), with characteristical psychical traits.

Cvijić noted the particular striking character of the Šumadinci as "something very strong, bold, with great activeness, and healthy nerves", that many of them are capable, "it seems, they manage to succeed in any enterprise", and that "there is increasingly appearing personalities with great will", "Foreign observers would have the impression that everyone thrives with intractible persistence and tenacity", "Rigid traditionalism has almost completely disappeared. All adapt to new ways of life. There is less talk, less epic poems and epic preferences than in pure Dinaric people". Among other traits, the Šumadinac has "common sense, measures and sense of reality. They know how to assess things and events fairly and without anger, when they are fully aware of these. The peasants are often characterized by sensing measures, which is rarely held by their schooled compatriots." They were shown to be a very honest and humorous people.

In popular culture
Songs
Smak, Šumadijski blues (1976)
Braća Bajić, Šumadijo, šumovita, folk song (?)
interpreted by Bora Spužić Kvaka (1981), Predrag Gojković Cune, Radiša Urošević (1990s), among others
Miroslav Ilić, Šumadijo, folk song (1982)
Rade Petrović, Šumadijo ko bi tebe ostavio, folk song (1981)
interpreted by Era Ojdanić, Šumadijo, Šumadijo
Snežana Đurišić, Odakle si, sele, folk song (1981)
Gordana Stojićević, Dobro jutro Šumadijo, folk song (1979)
Olivera Katarina, Šu, Šu, Šumadijo, pop song (1969)
Vasilija Radojčić, Šumadijo, rodni kraju, folk song (?)
interpreted by Pavle Stefanović (1977)

See also
Šumadija District
Geographical regions in Serbia
Šumadija and Western Serbia

References

Sources
Books
 
 
 

Journals

  
 
 

Other

External links

 
Geographical regions of Serbia
Historical regions in Serbia
Geography of Šumadija and Western Serbia
Geography of Southern and Eastern Serbia
Geography of Belgrade
Wine regions of Serbia